Franchesse is a commune in the Allier department in central France. The linguist Frantz Brunet (1879–1965) was born in Franchesse.

Population

See also
Communes of the Allier department

References

Communes of Allier
Allier communes articles needing translation from French Wikipedia
Bourbonnais